Cambalidae is a family of millipedes in the order Spirostreptida. There are at least 20 genera and 80 described species in Cambalidae.

Genera

References

Further reading

 
 
 
 

Spirostreptida
Millipede families